David Michele Azin (born 11 January 1990) is a German-Armenian footballer who currently plays as a midfielder for Indonesian Liga 1 club Persela Lamongan.

Career

Club
On 22 February 2012, Azin signed a two-year contract with Assyriska FF, but the contract was terminated by mutual consent on 13 November 2012.

At the end of March 2013, Azin signed for English fifth tier club Ebbsfleet United.

In August 2018, Azin signed for FC Ararat Yerevan.

International
Azin represented Western Armenia at the 2018 CONIFA World Football Cup.

References

External links
 Soccerway Profile

1990 births
Living people
Western Armenia international footballers
FC Pyunik players
Assyriska FF players
Ebbsfleet United F.C. players
FF Jaro players
C.F. União players
CD Eldense footballers
FC Ararat Yerevan players
Armenian Premier League players
Superettan players
Veikkausliiga players
Liga Portugal 2 players
Regionalliga players
Segunda División B players
Association football midfielders
Armenian footballers
German footballers
FC Wegberg-Beeck players
Footballers from Cologne